The Battle of Bhopal was fought on 24 December 1737 in Bhopal between the Maratha Empire and the combined army of the Nizam and several Mughal generals.

Background
As the Mughal empire continued to weaken after Aurangzeb's death, the Maratha Peshwa Bajirao I invaded Mughal territories such as Malwa and Gujarat. The Mughal emperor was alarmed by Marathas conquest. In 1737, the Marathas invaded the northern frontiers of the Mughal empire, reaching as far as the outskirts of Delhi, Bajirao defeated a Mughal army there and was marching back to Pune.

The Mughal emperor asked for support from the Nizam. The Nizam intercepted the Marathas during the latter's return journey. The two armies clashed near Bhopal.

Battle
The battle was fought between the Maratha Empire and Mughal forces led by Nizam of Hyderabad near Bhopal in India in December 1737. The Marathas poisoned the water and the replenishment supplies of the besieged Mughal forces. Chimaji was sent with an army of 10,000 men to stop any reinforcements while Bajirao blockaded the city instead of directly attacking the Nizam. The Nizam was forced to sue for peace after he was denied reinforcements from Delhi. The battle resulted in Maratha victory mainly because of the swift tactics of Maratha Peshwa Baji Rao.

Aftermath
Later, on 7 January 1738, a peace treaty was signed between Peshwa Bajirao and Jai Singh II, in Doraha near Bhopal. Marathas were given the territory of Malwa.

References 

Bhopal
Bhopal
History of Bhopal
Bhopal
1737 in Asia